J.N. College, Dhurwa, also known as Jagannath Nagar College, established in 1972, is a general degree college in Dhurwa, Ranchi. It offers undergraduate and postgraduate (Hindi, History 
& Political Science) courses in arts, commerce and sciences. JNC is a constituent unit of Ranchi University.

See also
Education in India
Ranchi University
Ranchi
Literacy in India
List of institutions of higher education in Jharkhand

References

External links

Colleges affiliated to Ranchi University
Educational institutions established in 1972
Universities and colleges in Ranchi
Universities and colleges in Jharkhand
1972 establishments in Bihar